"Tricked (That's the Way I Like It)" is a song by the band God Lives Underwater. It was originally released on their album Up Off The Floor in 2004, resulting in significant airplay.

Track listing
 Tricked (That's the Way I Like It) (3:49)

God Lives Underwater songs
2004 singles
2004 songs
Megaforce Records singles